Florence Magruder Gilmore (pen name, Florence Gilmore; February 13, 1881 – September 13, 1945) was an American author and settlement worker. She was a frequent contributor to the Catholic press, and wrote several novels.

Personal life and education

Florence Magruder Gilmore was born in Columbus, Ohio, February 13, 1881. Her father, James Gillespie Gilmore (1854-1904), was a senior member of the firm of Gilmore & Ruhl, St. Louis, Missouri. Through her father, she was connected with the prominent families of Blaine, Ewing and Sherman, in the U.S. Her mother was Florence (Magruder) Gilmore; through her mother, the she was connected with some of the well-known families of Scotland, including Clan MacGregor. 

Her siblings were a brother, Edward M. Gilmore, and two sisters, Reverend Mother Mary Gilmore, superior at Villa Duchesne, and Mother Frances Gilmore, Academy of the Sacred Heart, who were both Catholic nuns.

Gilmore attended Sacred Heart Convent school, Omaha, Nebraska, and Maryville College (now Maryville University), St. Louis, Missouri. In 1936, Gilmore received an Honorary B.Litt. from Maryville College.

Career
Gilmore was engaged in doing settlement work under Catholic organizations in St. Louis. 

She was a member of the staff of The Catholic Columbian (weekly), and a contributor to many periodicals, Catholic and non-sectarian. These included America, Extension, Benzinger's, Messenger of the Sacred Heart, Rosary, Leader , Ave Maria, St. Anthony Messenger, The Sign, The Missionary, Catholic World , and Atlantic Monthly. 

Gilmore published at least three novels with B. Herder of St. Louis, A Romance of Old Jerusalem (1911), 
Dr. Dumont (1911), and The Parting of the Ways (1914). In The Parting of the Ways, Gilmore tells the story of two youths whose association was interrupted by the different educational plans of their parents. The one receives a Catholic education, and his faith is the center of his life. The other attends secular schools, and his faith drops into the position of an accident. The story is allowed to point its moral by the simple unfolding of the plot without any offensive insistence.

There were several translations from French for Maryknoll, such as For the Faith, Martyr of Futuna, and Two Vincentian martyrs. Her poetry was included in the American Book of Verse.

Death
After a major operation, Florence Magruder Gilmore died in Columbus, Ohio, September 13, 1945.

Selected works

Novels
 A Romance of Old Jerusalem, 1911
 Dr. Dumont, 1911
 The Parting of the Ways, 1914

Short story collections
 Cowboy Or Priest: And Fourteen Other Stories, 1922

Adapted from the French
 For the Faith: Life of Just de Brentenières, by Camille Appert, 1918
 The Martyr of Futuna. Blessed Peter Chanel of the Society of Mary, 1918
 Two Vincentian martyrs, 1925

References

1881 births
1945 deaths
20th-century American novelists
20th-century American poets
20th-century American short story writers
20th-century American non-fiction writers
20th-century American women writers
American religious writers
American Roman Catholic religious writers
Catholics from Ohio
Writers from Columbus, Ohio